Polwatte Samaraweera Aratchilage Percy Samaraweera (18 March 1923 - 23 March 1999) was a Sri Lankan politician who belonged to the United National Party. He was educated at St John's College Panadura and St Sylvester's College, Kandy. He was the first Chief Minister  of Uva Province in Sri Lanka from 16 September 1988 to 6 June 1998 after which the council was dissolved and elections were held only in 1999. He was elected to the Sri Lankan Parliament in 1965 and 1977 from Welimada electorate.

References

Sri Lankan Buddhists
Chief Ministers of Uva Province
Provincial councillors of Sri Lanka
United National Party politicians
Members of the 6th Parliament of Ceylon
Members of the 8th Parliament of Sri Lanka
1999 deaths
1929 births
Alumni of St. John's College, Panadura
Alumni of St. Sylvester's College
Deputy ministers of Sri Lanka
Sinhalese politicians